Champignolles is the name of several communes in France:

Champignolles, Côte-d'Or
Champignolles, Eure